Batanovtsi is a town in western Bulgaria. It is located in Pernik Province and is close to the towns of Radomir and Pernik.

Geography 
Its located between the towns of Pernik and Radomir. In the land of the town of Batanovtsi is the village of Cherna gora, which has no land of its own.

History 
The town's name was first attested in a 1564 Bulgarian text: ВИШЄ СЄЛА БАТЄНОВЦИ БЛИЗЬ РЄЦЄ СТРОУМЄ, and several other sources from the 1560s. It is derived from the personal name Batan, probably of Pecheneg or Cuman origin. From 1950 to 1992 it was known as Temelkovo; it was proclaimed a town in 1974.

Religion 
Eastern orthodoxy

Notable people 

 Asen Daskalov (1899 – 1925), revolutionary

References

Towns in Bulgaria
Populated places in Pernik Province